Holy cow may refer to:
 Holy cow (expression), an exclamation of surprise
 Cattle in religion, particularly in Hinduism, Zoroastrianism, and ancient Egyptian religion
 Bull (mythology), as it pertains to ancient mythology 
 Holy Cow (novel), a 2015 novel by David Duchovny
 Holy Cow (film), a 2022 film

Proper names
 Holy Cow, an Indian travelogue by Sarah Macdonald (journalist)
 Holy Cow Casino and Brewery, a casino in Las Vegas, Nevada

Songs
 "Holy Cow" (Lee Dorsey song), a 1966 hit single by Lee Dorsey
 "Holy Cow", a song by K-OS on the album The Anchorman Mixtape
 "Holy Cow", a song by Yolanda Be Cool

See also
 Sacred cow (disambiguation)